MWM (formerly known as Madison Wells Media) is an American diversified entertainment company.  Founded by Gigi Pritzker and Clint Kisker in 2015, MWM produces film, television, live theater, podcasts, and interactive experiences.

History
Pritzker sought to "take advantage of a landscape that was rapidly changing and valuing 'content' in new ways," to "focus on storytellers in a way content never has before." MWM intended to create films, theater productions, and VR experiences under one umbrella to "expand and grow the IP that was born in any one of those units" through cross-pollination. Named after Madison and Wells Streets in Chicago, where Pritzker's great-grandfather sold newspapers when he was 12, MWM launched in November 2015.

At the time of its founding, MWM operated under the banners of OddLot Entertainment (film and television), Reality One (interactive), and Relevant Live (theater).  In 2017, to streamline its operations and increase flexibility across its multiple platforms, the divisions were brought together, and Reality One and Relevant Live were rebranded respectively as MWM Interactive and MWM Live. In November 2017, Oddlot was renamed MWM Studios. MWM Universe, an IP-focused division of MWM that acquires and develops properties across media including film, TV, gaming, comics and books, was established in 2018 when they partnered with Chicago-based artist Hebru Brantley and his Angry Hero Productions to create fully immersive storyworlds.

MWM Studios
MWM Studios, a division of MWM,  teams with storytellers to produce feature films and television programming and develops, finances and arranges global distribution for its original content.  The studio, led by Rachel Shane, CCO, and COO Adrian Alperovich, has produced films such as the Golden Globe and Academy Award-nominated Hell or High Water and the Emmy Award-winning television series Genius. Its adaptation of Jonathan Lethem's Motherless Brooklyn (written by, directed, and starring Edward Norton) was released in November, 2019.

Filmography

Motherless Brooklyn
21 Bridges
My Spy 
Hell or High Water
Drive
Genius: Picasso 
Landline 
Genius: Einstein 
Ender's Game 
Rosewater 
Rabbit Hole 
The Way, Way Back 
Genius: Aretha 
The Eyes of Tammy Faye 
The Thing About Jellyfish

MWM Universe
Established in 2018, the IP-focused division of the company, MWM Universe, acquires IP and builds out franchisable story worlds, acts as a strategic partner to MWM investment companies including Wonderstorm.

Projects
Voyage To The Stars
The Dragon Prince
Nevermore Park

MWM Interactive
The interactive division, previously known as MWM Immersive, creates and publishes video games and produces virtual reality experiences.

VR Projects

War Remains 
Chained: A Victorian Nightmare
Groundhog Day: Like Father Like Son 
SoKrispy Daydreams

Game Titles
Creature in the Well

Mundaun

MWM Live
MWM Live is the live global entertainment division of MWM. It is led by executive producer Jamie Forshaw, formerly the VP of Production for Andrew Lloyd Weber's Really Useful Group. MWM Live has developed and produced projects such as the Broadway musical, Hadestown, and Million Dollar Quartet, which inspired the CMT series Sun Records.

Plays and musicals
Hadestown
The Inheritance 
Million Dollar Quartet 
Company (2021 revival)
Red Roses, Green Gold 
Snapshots

Selected awards and nominations

Academy Awards

British Academy Film Awards

Emmy Awards

Golden Globe Awards

References

External links
 Madison Wells Media official site 

Film production companies of the United States
Entertainment companies established in 2015